Darin Strauss is a best-selling American writer whose work has earned a number of awards, including, among numerous others, a Guggenheim Fellowship and the National Book Critics Circle Award.  Strauss's 2011 book Half a Life, won the 2011 NBCC Award for memoir/autobiography. His most recent book, The Queen of Tuesday, came out in August, 2020. It is currently nominated for the Joyce Carol Oates Literary Prize.

Early life
Strauss was born in the Long Island town of Roslyn Harbor. He attended Tufts University, where he studied with Jay Cantor. After attending graduate school at New York University, he played guitar in a band with Jonathan Coulton

Career

Chang & Eng
His ALA Alex Award-winning, best-selling 2000 first novel Chang & Eng, – a runner-up for the Barnes & Noble Discover Award, the Literary Lions Award, a Borders Award winner, and a nominee for the PEN Hemingway award, among others – is based on the lives of the famous conjoined twins Chang and Eng. Chang & Eng was a Los Angeles Times Best Book of the Year, a Newsweek Best Book of the Year, among others. The rights to the novel were optioned to Disney, for the director Julie Taymor; the actor Gary Oldman purchased the rights from Disney. Strauss and Oldman are together adapting Chang and Eng for the screen.

The Real McCoy
Strauss's second book, The Real McCoy (2002), was based on the life of the boxer Charles "Kid McCoy." "The Real McCoy" was named a New York Times Notable Book,"  and one of the "25 Best Books of the Year," by the New York Public Library.

It was after this novel that Strauss won a Guggenheim Fellowship in Fiction Writing.

More Than It Hurts You
Strauss's third novel, More Than It Hurts You, his first in a contemporary setting, was published by PenguinPutnam in 2008.  The book made a number of year-end best-book lists, and was also a national bestseller—reaching as high as No. 3 on both the Denver Post and Rocky Mountain News lists, and No. 6 on the New York Post list, in July 2008. Publicity for the book was strong, and Strauss blogged about his extensive book-tour for Newsweek, and was featured on The Late Late Show with Craig Ferguson and Good Morning America.

Half a Life
Strauss appeared on This American Life in a July 2008 episode titled "Life After Death," in which he talks about the effects of a traffic accident during high school, in which a classmate on a bicycle swerved in front of his car, and was killed.  Although he could not have avoided the accident, and was not at fault, he still felt guilty, and it affected him for decades.

His next book, Half a Life is a memoir concerning that traffic accident; it was published by McSweeney's in September 2010, and was excerpted in GQ magazine, and This American Life, and also in The Times and The Daily Mail (UK). Half a Life was named an Entertainment Weekly Must Read and a New York Times Editor's Pick—and a Best Book of the Year by NPR, Amazon.com, The Plain Dealer, and The San Francisco Chronicle, among many others. A critical favorite in the UK, Half a Life was called "a masterpiece" by Robert McCrum in The Guardian, "one of the best books I have ever read" by Ali Catterall on The BBC, as well as "precise, elegantly written, fresh, wise, and very sad ... indicative not only of a very talented writer, but of a proper human being" by Nick Hornby.

Half a Life won the 2011 National Book Critics Circle Award (Autobiography).

The Queen of Tuesday
His most recent book, The Queen of Tuesday, is a hybrid of fiction, biography, and memoir, focused around an imagined love-affair between the author's grandfather and Lucille Ball. Another critical success, it has received favorable reviews in The New York Times, The Boston Globe, The Washington Post, the New Yorker, the Los Angeles Times, among many others. The Millions declared, of the novel, "The best book yet from one of our best writers." In "New Pop Lit," Karl Wenclas wrote,  "If Darin Strauss isn't the best contemporary American writer, he's near the top ... No one could write a better book!" On NBC News, Bill Goldstein said "I love this book ... Brilliant."

The novel was a Washington Post Best Book of the Year, a The Millions and Lit Hub Best Book of the Year, and a finalist for the Joyce Carol Oates Literary Prize, as well as being featured on CBS Sunday Morning.

Critical reception
Strauss has been called "a brave new voice in literature" by The Wall Street Journal, and "one of the most sharp and spirited of his generation," by Powells Books, "sublime" and "brilliant" by The Boston Globe.

Personal life
Strauss is married to the journalist Susannah Meadows, who writes a monthly Newly Released Books column for The New York Times''' daily Arts Section. He is the father of identical twin boys. He currently resides in Brooklyn, New York, and teaches writing at New York University.

Awards and honors
2021: Joyce Carol Oates Literary Prize, finalist (winner to be announced in April, 2021) 
2020: "Best Books of the Year," The Washington Post2020: "Best Books of the Year," Literary Hub
2011: National Book Critics Circle Award, Winner
2011: New York University's Alumni Achievement Award, Winner
2010: "Editor's Choice," The New York Times2010: "Best Books of the Year," NPR
2010: "Best Books of the Year," The Plain Dealer (Cleveland, Ohio)
2010: "Best Books of the Year," Amazon
2010: "Best Books of the Year," San Francisco Chronicle2008: "Best Books of the Year," Denver Post2008: "Book of the Summer," GQ Magazine2006: Guggenheim Fellowship, Winner
2005: "Outstanding Dozen" teaching award, New York University, Winner
2002: "Times Notable Book," The New York Times2002: "25 Best Books of the Year," New York Public Library
2000: "10 Best Novels of the Year," Newsweek2000:"Best Books of the Year," Los Angeles Times2000: ALA Alex Award, Winner
2000: Barnes & Noble Discover Award, Runner-up
2000: NYPL Literary Lions Award, Finalist

Bibliography

Novels
 Chang & Eng (2000)	
 The Real McCoy (2002)
 More Than It Hurts You (2008)
 The Queen of Tuesday (2020)

Nonfiction
 Half a Life (2010)

Graphic novel
 Olivia Twist (2019)

Selected anthologies
 Lit Riffs (2004)	
 The Dictionary of Failed Relationships (2004)
 Coaches (2005)	
 A People's Fictional History of the United States (2006)
 An Encyclopedia of Exes (2004)
 Bloodshot: An Insomnia Anthology (2007)
 Brooklyn Was Mine (2008)
 Brothers (2009)
 The Book of Dads (2009)
 Top of The Order: Best-selling writers on Baseball (2010)

Other
 Mr. Beluncle, by V. S. Pritchett; Strauss wrote the new introduction (2005)
 Long Island Shaolin, one of the first Kindle Singles—short works published by Amazon; other Kindle Single debut authors include Jodi Picoult and Rich Cohen

See also
 Radio Interview with Darin Strauss on "Read First, Ask Later" (Ep. 11)''

References

External links

1970 births
Living people
21st-century American novelists
American male novelists
21st-century American memoirists
People from Roslyn Harbor, New York
Novelists from New York (state)
Tufts University alumni
21st-century American male writers
American male non-fiction writers